George Cooper Stevens (December 18, 1904 – March 8, 1975) was an American film director, producer, screenwriter and cinematographer. Films he produced were nominated for the Academy Award for Best Motion Picture six times while he had five nominations as Best Director, winning twice.

Among his most notable films are Swing Time (1936), Gunga Din (1939) and the five movies for which he was nominated for Best Director: The More the Merrier (1943); A Place in the Sun (1951), for which he won the Best Director Oscar; Shane (1953), Giant (1956), for which he won the Best Director Oscar, and The Diary of Anne Frank (1959).

Biography

Film career
Stevens was born on December 18, 1904, in Oakland, California, the son of Landers Stevens and Georgie Cooper, both stage actors. Drama critic Ashton Stevens and film director James W. Horne were his uncles. He also had two brothers, Jack, a cinematographer, and writer Aston Stevens. He learned about the stage by watching his parents, and himself acted in plays in San Francisco. At the age of 10, his mother gave him a Brownie camera, and he began photographing the city and portraits of his mother. At the age of 17, Hal Roach Studios employed him as an assistant cameraman filming Rex the Wonder Horse in Utah. Stevens helped grant Stan Laurel a film career, as the studio had trouble getting the comedian's blue eyes to register on film, but Stevens made a successful test of him using panchromatic film. He worked as director of photography and a gag writer on 35 Laurel and Hardy short films, such as Bacon Grabbers (1929) and Night Owls (1930); according to Stevens he learned from this experience that comedy could be "graceful and human". In 1928, he met Yvonne Howell in Oliver Hardy's home; they were married on January 1, 1930. In the early 1930s, Stevens began to disagree with Roach's studio, wanting to flesh out characters rather than just make slapstick comedy. This led to a suspension and his departure from the studio. In 1933, he directed his first feature film, The Cohens and Kellys in Trouble, for Universal Pictures.

In 1934, Stevens was hired by RKO Pictures, and he directed the slapstick film Kentucky Kernels. His big break came when he directed Katharine Hepburn the next year in Alice Adams; according to Hepburn, Stevens felt that she got him the job. He would subsequently make seven films for the studio in five years. In the late 1930s, he directed Fred Astaire and Ginger Rogers together in the musical Swing Time and separately in A Damsel in Distress and Vivacious Lady, respectively. In 1939, Stevens directed Cary Grant in the large-scale Gunga Din, costing over $1 million as RKO's most expensive film to date; though the studio feared its ballooning budget, it ended up a profitable success. In 1940, he directed Carole Lombard in Vigil in the Night. In 1942, he reunited with Hepburn at her behest to film Woman of the Year.

Stevens served as president of the Screen Directors Guild (SDG) from 1941 to 1943. After seeing the Nazi propaganda film Triumph of the Will (1935), he was provoked to join the Allied forces in World War II. He joined the U.S. Army Signal Corps and headed a film unit from 1943 to 1946, under General Dwight D. Eisenhower. His unit shot footage—including the only color film of the war in Europe (which remained archived for decades)—documenting the Normandy landings (D-Day), the liberation of Paris, the meeting of American and Soviet forces at the Elbe River, and the Allied discovery of both the Duben labor camp and Dachau concentration camp. Stevens helped prepare the Duben and Dachau footage and other material for presentation during the Nuremberg Trials; this was released as the hour-long Nazi Concentration and Prison Camps (1945). In 2008, Stevens's footage was entered into the U.S. National Film Registry by the Library of Congress as an "essential visual record" of the war.

In 1946, Stevens resumed his duties as president of the SDG, remaining so until 1948. As a result of his experiences during the war, his films became more dramatic. The drama I Remember Mama (1948) was only partly comedic. In 1950, during the McCarthyist scare and related Hollywood blacklist, Stevens defended Joseph L. Mankiewicz from Cecil B. DeMille's attempt to recall him as president of the SDG. Stevens went on to direct such classic films as the drama A Place in the Sun (1951), the Western Shane (1953), the epic Western drama Giant (1956), the biographical Holocaust drama The Diary of Anne Frank (1959), and his biblical epic of Jesus, The Greatest Story Ever Told (1965). He ended his directing career with the 1970 romantic comedy-drama The Only Game in Town with Warren Beatty and Elizabeth Taylor. That year, he was head of the jury at the 20th Berlin International Film Festival, which ended in scandal. In 1973, he was a member of the jury at the 8th Moscow International Film Festival.

Personal life
During his time filming wild horses with Hal Roach Studios in Utah, Stevens bonded with the Comanche. A number of subsequent associates would speculate that he was part Native American.

Stevens was the father of television and film writer-producer-director George Stevens, Jr., the founder of the American Film Institute (AFI). George Jr. produced and directed the documentary about his father George Stevens: A Filmmaker's Journey in 1984 and is the father of Stevens's grandson Michael Stevens (1966–2015), who was also a television and film producer-director.

Death
Stevens died following a heart attack on March 8, 1975, on his ranch in Lancaster, California, north of Los Angeles. He is interred at Forest Lawn Memorial Park in the Hollywood Hills of Los Angeles.

Awards
As a lieutenant colonel in the U.S. Army, Stevens headed the Signal Corps unit that filmed D-Day and the liberation of the Dachau concentration camp. For these contributions, he was awarded the Legion of Merit.

Stevens has a star on the Hollywood Walk of Fame at 1701 Vine Street. He won the Academy Award for Best Director twice, in 1951 for A Place in the Sun and in 1956 for Giant. He was also nominated in 1943 for The More the Merrier, in 1954 for Shane, and in 1959 for The Diary of Anne Frank.

Archives
The moving image collection of George Stevens is held at the Academy Film Archive. The film material at AFI is complemented by material in the George Stevens papers at the Academy's Margaret Herrick Library.

Filmography

Other work

Academy Awards

References

Further reading
 Cronin, Paul: George Stevens: Interviews. Jackson, MS, University Press of Mississippi, 2004. 
 Moss, Marilyn Ann: Giant: George Stevens, a Life on Film. Madison, WI, University of Wisconsin Press, 2004. 
 Petri, Bruce: A Theory of American Film: The Films and Techniques of George Stevens. New York, Taylor & Francis, 1987. 
 Richie, Donald: George Stevens: An American Romantic. New York, Taylor & Francis, 1984 (reprint of 1970 original).

External links

 George Stevens: Movie Movie
 George Stevens papers, Margaret Herrick Library, Academy of Motion Picture Arts and Sciences

1904 births
1975 deaths
United States Army personnel of World War II
Best Directing Academy Award winners
Presidents of the Directors Guild of America
Presidents of the Academy of Motion Picture Arts and Sciences
Writers from Oakland, California
Western (genre) film directors
American cinematographers
American male screenwriters
Film producers from California
Recipients of the Legion of Merit
Film directors from California
Burials at Forest Lawn Memorial Park (Hollywood Hills)
Golden Globe Award-winning producers
Directors Guild of America Award winners
20th-century American businesspeople
Activists from California
Screenwriters from California
20th-century American male writers
20th-century American screenwriters